Neophygopoda is a genus of beetles in the family Cerambycidae.

Species 
Neophygopoda contains the following species:
 Neophygopoda nigritarsis (Gounelle, 1911)
 Neophygopoda tibialis Melzer, 1933

References

Rhinotragini